Pedestrian, formerly PEDESTRIAN.TV, is a youth digital news and entertainment website based in Sydney, Australia, which has existed since 2005. It is owned by Pedestrian Group, a company created by Nine Entertainment in 2018 after buying out PEDESTRIAN.TV and merging it with Allure Media, three years after acquiring a majority share in PEDESTRIAN.TV.

 Pedestrian Group owns Pedestrian (the website) as well the Australian brands Vice Media (Australia), Business Insider Australia, Gizmodo AU, Refinery29, Lifehacker Australia, Kotaku Australia, Pedestrian JOBS, and Openair Cinemas.

History 
Launched in 2005 by co-founders Chris Wirasinha and Oscar Martin, Pedestrian.TV was initially distributed as a DVD magazine, stylised as a "Plastizine", with the advertorial backing of BMW Mini. In 2007, the company shifted online, launching the Pedestrian.TV site.

In 2010, the company launched sub-site Pedestrian JOBS; a creative industries-focused employment classifieds board.

Nine Entertainment Co. subsequently acquired a 60% stake in Pedestrian.TV in 2015 for a reported $10 million. Nine bought out Wirasinha and Martin's remaining 40% ownership share in 2018 for an additional $39 million, putting the company's total valuation just shy of $100 million.

In 2017 Pedestrian.TV broke the story of youth government broadcaster Triple J's initial internal discussions regarding moving the Triple J Hottest 100 away from the controversial January 26 Australia Day public holiday. Triple J ultimately shifted the Hottest 100 date to the fourth weekend in January, citing a desire to remain "an event that everyone can enjoy together."

Following the merger of Nine and Fairfax Media in 2018, the business behind Pedestrian.TV was merged with that of Allure Media, forming the larger Pedestrian Group, with the website changing its name to Pedestrian, and also incorporating the brands Business Insider Australia, Gizmodo, Kotaku and POPSUGAR Australia. It was announced that it would continue to be run by its founders.

With Wirasinha and Martin shifting to advisory roles following the sale, Nine appointed Matt Rowley as the CEO of Pedestrian Group in early 2019. Also in 2019, Pedestrian acquired Openair Cinemas (formerly American Express Openair Cinemas, which arranged outdoor showings of films in open spaces across Australia and New Zealand).

According to audience data in September 2019, the website reached over one million unique users per month, and attracted in excess of two million monthly page views.

PopSugar was still part of the group in September 2019, but appears to have been dropped by March 2022.

In March 2021, Pedestrian Group announced a multi-year deal with Vice Media and Refinery29 to become the Australian digital publishing home of both brands. A new team was announced for Refinery29 later that year, and in January 2022 a new team of five, headed by Brad Esposito, was announced to head up Vice Australia and New Zealand.

Description
Pedestrian is based in Sydney, New South Wales, Australia.

 the Pedestrian Group owns Pedestrian and the Australian brands Vice Media (Australia), Business Insider Australia, Gizmodo AU, Refinery29, Lifehacker Australia, Kotaku, Pedestrian JOBS, and Openair Cinemas.

Key people
Matt Rowley is CEO of Pedestrian Group, while Vanessa Lawrence is Publisher.

Awards 
Pedestrian.TV was awarded Brand of the Year by Mumbrella in 2015, 2016, and also 2020, with Pedestrian Group winning three other Mumbrella awards, for Best Publisher-Led Advertising Campaign, Event of the Year, and Branded Content Studio of the Year in the same year.

References

External links
 

2005 establishments in Australia
Internet properties established in 2005
Australian news websites
Australian entertainment websites
Nine Entertainment